The legislative districts of Zambales are the representations of the province of Zambales and the highly urbanized city of Olongapo in the various national legislatures of the Philippines. The province and the city are currently represented in the lower house of the Congress of the Philippines through their first and second congressional districts.

History 
Zambales, including the city of Olongapo (chartered in 1966), comprised a lone district from 1898 to 1972. The province and chartered city were represented in the Interim Batasang Pambansa as part of Region III from 1978 to 1984.

Zambales elected one representative to the Regular Batasang Pambansa in 1984, with Olongapo sending a separate representative as a highly urbanized city. Effective February 11, 1987, the province, with Olongapo regrouping with it, was divided into two congressional districts under the new Constitution, and elected members to the restored House of Representatives starting that same year.

Current Districts 
 Lakas–CMD (2)

Historical Districts

Lone District (defunct) 

Municipalities: Botolan, Iba, Masinloc, Olongapo (nominally annexed to Subic 1913, re-established 1959, became city 1966), San Marcelino, San Narciso, Santa Cruz, Subic, Cabangan (re-established 1907), San Felipe (re-established 1908), San Antonio (re-established 1908), Palauig (re-established 1909), Candelaria (re-established 1909)

Notes

At-Large (defunct)

1898–1899

1943–1944

1984–1986

See also 
 Legislative district of Olongapo

References 

Zambales
Politics of Zambales